"Basket Case" is a song by American rock band Green Day, released in August 1994 as the third single from their third studio album, Dookie (1994). The song spent five weeks at the top of the US Billboard Alternative Songs chart and garnered a Grammy Award nomination in the category for Best Rock Vocal Performance by a Duo or Group. In 2001, the song appeared on their greatest hits album International Superhits!. In 2021, "Basket Case" was ranked no. 150 in Rolling Stone's 500 Greatest Songs of All Time.

Origin and recording
Green Day vocalist/guitarist Billie Joe Armstrong said "Basket Case" is about his struggle with anxiety; before he was diagnosed with a panic disorder years afterward, he thought he was going crazy. Armstrong commented that at the time, "The only way I could know what the hell was going on was to write a song about it."

"Basket Case" was one of the songs producer Rob Cavallo heard when he received Green Day's demo tape. He ended up signing the band to Reprise Records in mid-1993. Green Day and Cavallo recorded the version of "Basket Case" released on the trio's major label debut Dookie between September and October 1993 at Fantasy Studios in Berkeley, California.

In April 2021, Armstrong revealed in his book Welcome to My Panic that he wrote the song whilst on speed.

Composition

"Basket Case", is a punk rock and pop-punk song, performed in the key of E-flat. The introductory verse features only Armstrong and his guitar. During the middle of the first chorus, the rest of the band joins in, with Tré Cool adding fast tom fills and explosive transitions and Mike Dirnt adding a bass line that is reminiscent of the vocal melody. In the second verse, "Basket Case" references soliciting a male prostitute; Armstrong noted that "I wanted to challenge myself and whoever the listener might be. It's also looking at the world and saying, 'It's not as black and white as you think. This isn't your grandfather's prostitute – or maybe it was.'" The song's chord progression closely mirrors that of Pachelbel's Canon.

Release and reception
"Basket Case" was the second single released from Dookie, following "Longview". "Basket Case" peaked at number one on the Billboard Modern Rock Tracks chart, a position it maintained for five weeks. In 1995, "Basket Case" garnered a Grammy Award nomination in the Best Rock Vocal Performance by a Duo or Group category.

In his weekly UK chart commentary, James Masterton wrote, "Something of an instant classic [...] it is certainly one of the most alternative Top 10 smash since Radiohead's "Creep". As to where it goes next it is hard to tell but it could potentially open the door for a flood of the post-Nirvana young American rock bands who are currently making waves on the other side of the Atlantic." British magazine Music Week gave it three out of five, describing it as "the Generation X-flag-wavers' splenetic slice of Bay Area punk". Paul Evans from Rolling Stone declared it as a "rave-up", noting that Green Day's lyrics "score graffiti hits". Charles Aaron from Spin ranked "Basket Case" number 19 in his list of the "Top 20 Singles of the Year" in December 1994. Troy J. Augusto from Variety called it "psycho-rave".

In 2006, on Mike Davies and Zane Lowe's Lock Up Special on BBC Radio 1, the listeners voted "Basket Case" the Greatest Punk Song of All Time. In 2009, it was named the 33rd best hard rock song of all time by VH1. In 2021, Kerrang ranked the song number three on their list of the 20 greatest Green Day songs, and in 2022, American Songwriter ranked the song number two on their list of the 10 greatest Green Day songs.

Music video
The accompanying music video for "Basket Case" was directed by Mark Kohr. It was filmed in an actual mental institution called Agnews Developmental Center in Santa Clara County, California, at the request of the band members. The mental institution had been abandoned, but most of the structure remained in a broken-down state. The band members found old patient files, deep scratches in the walls and dental molds scattered around. The video frequently references the films One Flew Over the Cuckoo's Nest and Brazil. The music video was originally filmed in black and white and the color was added in later, however the patients of the mental institution remain black and white in the video.

The video was nominated for nine MTV Video Music Awards in 1995: Video of the Year, Best Group Video, Best Metal/Hard Rock Video, Best Alternative Video, Breakthrough Video, Best Direction, Best Editing, Best Cinematography, and Viewer's Choice Award. The video did not win in any of the categories it was nominated for.

The video for "Basket Case" was later published on Green Day's official YouTube channel in October 2009. It has amassed more than 303 million views as of December 2022.

Track listing

 Initial pressing
 "Basket Case" – 3:01
 "On the Wagon"  – 2:48
 "Tired of Waiting for You" – 2:30
 "409 in Your Coffeemaker" [Unmixed]  – 2:49
 Alternate pressing/Limited edition pressing
 "Basket Case" – 3:01
 "Longview" (live) – 3:30
 "Burnout" (live) – 2:03
 "2,000 Light Years Away" (live) – 2:49
Note: Live tracks recorded March 11, 1994 at Jannus Landing, St. Petersburg, Florida. These tracks are also available on the live EP Live Tracks

 Japanese version
 "Basket Case" – 3:01
 "She" – 2:14
 "Emenius Sleepus" – 1:43
 7" vinyl singles box set
 "Basket Case" – 3:01
 "When I Come Around" – 2:58
 "Having a Blast" – 2:44
 "When I Come Around" (Live from Stockholm, Sweden) — 2:49

Credits and personnel
 Songwriting: Billie Joe Armstrong, Mike Dirnt, Tré Cool
 Production: Rob Cavallo, Green Day

Charts

Weekly charts

Year-end charts

Certifications

References
 Spitz, Mark (2006). Nobody Likes You: Inside the Turbulent Life, Times, and Music of Green Day. Hyperion.

Notes

External links
 Official music video on YouTube

Green Day songs
1994 singles
Songs written by Billie Joe Armstrong
Song recordings produced by Rob Cavallo
Songs about prostitutes
LGBT-related songs
Songs about mental health
Songs written by Tré Cool
Reprise Records singles
1994 songs
Songs written by Mike Dirnt
Avril Lavigne songs